Clanculus scotti is a species of sea snail, a marine gastropod mollusk in the family Trochidae, the top snails.

Description
The size of the shell varies between 8.5 mm and 14 mm.

Distribution
This marine species occurs off the Philippines.

References

External links
 

scotti
Gastropods described in 2006